The Centre of Ecology & Rural Development (CERD) is an Indian organization that is part of the Pondicherry Science Forum. It was exclusively formed for taking up meaningful interventions in Health, Sanitation, Natural Resource Management, Energy, Watershed management and ICT for development.

CERD was set up in the year 1994 jointly by the Pondicherry Science Forum and Tamil Nadu Science Forum to take up S&T based development initiatives improving the rural livelihoods of weaker sections. The earlier works included interventions in sericulture, vegetable leather tanning, fish aggregation device etc.

CERD has a field station at Bahoor called the Kalanjiyam (meaning Granary in Tamil) which acts as a hub of agriculture and technology options for the surrounding area.

CERD has a full-time manpower structure with a committed team of scientists working on a variety of areas ranging from women’s technology, science communication, Continuing Education, Participatory Irrigation management through local democratic people’s institutions, women’s microcredit networks etc.

The latest of the projects that CERD is now implementing includes the Women’s Technology Park (WTP), and AICP Project on BIOFARM, a watershed development project in Sedappatti Block of Madurai funded by NABARD, the Tank Rehabilitation Project-Pondicherry etc.

Soil Fertility Management

R&D Work on Alternate Soil Fertility Management Strategies Systems for Irrigated and dryland crops. Developed Decision System (DSS) for Soil Fertility Mgmt.

Bioresource integrated Farming

Reduction of external inputs. Increasing internal resource flows in the farming system. Ensuring nutritional security of the whole farming system.

Watershed Development

Initiated programmes in Madurai district. Participatory planning, implementation and management of the Watershed through people’s organizations.

Participatory Irrigation Management

Pilot work on irrigation tanks in Pondicherry. Evolved guidelines for sustainable institutional structures. All stakeholder participation was ensured including women, Dalits of landless communities. Large scale encroachment eviction through participatory approach leading to Participatory Irrigation Mgmt. Worked in low energy technologies for water system development (Oorani – drinking water pond) in Ramanathapuram

Wasteland Reclamation

Evolved successful models for participatory wasteland reclamation through a coalition between landless SHG women and farmers’ groups. Sustainable income for landless Self-help Group (SHG) women through collective farming.

ICT for Rural Development

Established the first successful model of Village Information Centre known as Samadhan Kendra through unique content creation in the local language. Software creation for local planning and primary production in local language including Decision Support Systems.

Fuel-Efficient Stoves

CERD will expand its activities in this area by constructing more stoves and also by expanding the works to other areas like Tamil Nadu etc. CERD construction of a fuel-efficient Tawa for making dosa/parotta also more of this also will be done during the coming years. Subsidies from the Renewable Energy Agency will be sought for the Tawa stove also and that will be another recognition for the work being carried out.

Biomass-based Biogas Units

With technical collaboration from IISc. Bangalore, CERD will be constructing biogas units and this will be a new area that CERD will be treading to. The units are not gobar based but instead will be based on biomass decomposition and tapping the biogas for cooking purposes.

Organic Farming

Already an Organic Farmers’ Association has been formed and CERD will be extending full support to expanding this network including getting organic certification processes for the farmers and for arranging marketing linkages for their organic produce. This will have full backward and forward linkages starting from seeds, plant protection, harvest and post-harvest options.

Nutrition based Kitchen Gardening systems

This will be mainly women-focused especially for women under SHGs 
since the malnutrition levels of women in Pondicherry are very high and it is estimated that about 80% of women face malnutrition. This programme also will have complete backward and forward linkages from seeds, bio-manures, biopesticides, processing and value addition etc.

Micro enterprises for SHG women and weaker sections

CERD will be concentrating more on viable village-level enterprises for improved livelihood options for women, Dalits and other weaker sections with providing necessary S&T inputs and EDP skills.

External links
 CERD 
 http://www.thehindu.com/todays-paper/tp-national/tp-otherstates/smokefree-less-fuel-hot-cooking-style/article1219204.ece
 Member of Water Conflict Forum

Ecology
Organisations based in Puducherry
Environmental organisations based in India
1994 establishments in Pondicherry
Organizations established in 1994